Highway 11 is an Iraqi highway which extends from Baghdad to Syria.  It passes through Al Fallujah, Al Ramadi, Al Habbaniyah and Ar Rutbah.

Roads in Iraq